Savkiyaz (Säwkiyaź) is a rural locality (a selo) in Kalmiyarovsky Selsoviet, Tatyshlinsky District, Bashkortostan, Russia. The population was 249 as of 2010. There are 4 streets.

Geography 
Savkiyaz is located 18 km south of Verkhniye Tatyshly (the district's administrative centre) by road. Maysk is the nearest rural locality.

References 

Rural localities in Tatyshlinsky District